Brachyplatystoma vaillantii, the Laulao catfish or piramuta, is a species of catfish of the family Pimelodidae that is native to Amazon and Orinoco River basins and major rivers of the Guianas and northeastern Brazil.

The fish is named in honor of François Levaillant (1753-1824) a French explorer, naturalist and zoological collector, who brought the type specimens to Europe.

Distribution
It is a much widespread species that is found rivers and estuaries of Amazon and Orinoco watersheds, Guianas and northeastern Brazil.

Description
It grows to a length of 150 cm. Dorsum dark to light grey or brown, no spots or stripes. Ventrum much paler to give striking counter shading.

It is entirely piscivorous preying on loricariids and other bottom-dwelling fish.

Ecology
It is found in both freshwater and brackish water systems. It is a demersal potamodromous fish commonly inhabits muddy waters and deeper, flowing channels. Juveniles and sub adults are migratory.

References

Pimelodidae
Catfish of South America
Freshwater fish of Brazil
Taxa named by Achille Valenciennes
Fish described in 1840